Djibo is a department or commune of Soum Province in north-western Burkina Faso. Its capital is the town of Djibo.

Towns and villages

References

Departments of Burkina Faso
Soum Province